Hell and Back is the second studio album by rapper Drag-On. Originally scheduled for a September 16, 2003 release, the album was ultimately released February 10, 2004. It was released through Virgin Records and Ruff Ryders and featured production from the likes of Swizz Beatz and Rockwilder. Hell and Back was not as successful as his previous album, only peaking at number 47 on the Billboard 200, however it did fare better on the Top R&B/Hip-Hop Albums, peaking at number 5.

Due to the disappointing album sales Drag-On was quickly dropped from Virgin Records

Critical reception

AllMusic editor Andy Kellman found the album to be lackluster compared to Opposite of H2O, criticizing the producers and Drag-On's label mates for crafting uninspired beats and lyrics. Jon Caramanica, writing for Rolling Stone, commended Drag-On for emulating DMX's world-weary flow and fine-tuning his lyricism but felt that he squandered it when either compared to the album's guest artists or delivering generic party tracks. Vibe writer Laura Checkoway praised the combination of Drag-On's vocal delivery over idiosyncratic production and his attempts at lyrical growth on "My First Child" and "Life Is Short", despite diverting away from that established blueprint, concluding that "Hell and Back is still a trip worthwhile."

Track listing

Charts

Weekly charts

Year-end charts

References

Drag-On albums
2004 albums
Albums produced by Rockwilder
Albums produced by Swizz Beatz
Virgin Records albums
Ruff Ryders Entertainment albums
Albums produced by Neo da Matrix